The Journal of Hazardous, Toxic, and Radioactive Waste  is a quarterly peer-reviewed scientific journal published by the American Society of Civil Engineers and covering planning and management for hazardous, toxic and radioactive wastes.

History
The journal was established in 1997 as the Practice Periodical of Hazardous, Toxic, and Radioactive Waste, obtaining its current name in 2010.

Abstracting and indexing
The journal is abstracted and indexed in Ei Compendex, ProQuest databases, Civil Engineering Database, Inspec, Scopus, and EBSCO databases.

References

External links

Engineering journals
American Society of Civil Engineers academic journals
Quarterly journals
English-language journals
Publications established in 1997